Reason is the second solo album by English singer Melanie C, released on 10 March 2003 by Virgin Records. It was the follow-up to Northern Star, and reached number five on the UK Albums Chart, selling 30,876 copies in its first week. Although not performing as well as Northern Star, Reason was certified Gold in the United Kingdom, with 101,889 copies sold. The album has sold 500,000 copies worldwide. The album has been released with the Copy Control protection system in some regions. Most reviews for the album were mixed.

Background and recording
After the success of Northern Star, Melanie C was considered the only member of the Spice Girls to have established a steady successful career as a solo artist. At this time, she was the only member of the Spice Girls to still have a contract with Virgin Records, since the rest of the Spice Girls had departed from Virgin as solo artists.

Chisholm had spent most of 2000 and 2001 touring around the world in promotion of Northern Star, and planned to enter the studio at the end of 2001 to start recording her next album. During this time, things for Chisholm proved to be difficult, as she was diagnosed with depression in 1999. She later revealed that it was difficult for her to handle the publicity and hard work during the Spice Girls days, and some days she would eat too little and exercise to the point of exhaustion. At the end of 1999, Chisholm's depression worsened and she spent days in bed, unable to cope with her day-to-day routine. After being diagnosed with depression she was prescribed antidepressants for 18 months, and also dealt with an eating disorder and a hostile media reaction questioning different topics from her weight to her sexuality.

During the early stages of Reasons recording sessions in November 2001, Virgin Records executives were worried about the musical style of the album, as Chisholm's biggest hits from her debut album were an R&B single ("Never Be the Same Again") and a dance single ("I Turn to You"), and Chisholm had insisted that she wanted to keep making pop rock albums. According to The Sun, a record company source stated that "both Mel and Virgin have agreed that she should keep to the rock vibe that helped her 1999 album, Northern Star, do so well. But that is where their agreement ends". Chisholm had already stated that she wanted to work with new producers, while retaining some of the producers that had worked on her debut album. The original release date for the album was set for October 2002 but it was delayed until March 2003, resulting in a number of articles in newspapers questioning her relationship with her record company, reporting that she was under pressure to lose weight. On an official statement published on her site, Chisholm stated that her relationship with Virgin was "fantastic", the recording sessions were going well and that she had not been forced to delay the release of the album or to lose weight. During the recording sessions for the album, a total of 40 songs were recorded. On 12 November 2002, the album title was revealed on her official site.

In January 2003, Chisholm gave an official track-by-track review to the press, revealing the album's track list, which was quite different to the final track list. Chisholm stated that she was happy with having some of the Northern Star composers and producers on Reason as well as working with new ones, like David Arnold, Tore Johansson and Peter Vettese. Originally the album included 11 tracks with the following order: "Here It Comes Again", "On the Horizon", "Reason", "Lose Myself in You", "Let's Love", "Home", "Soul Boy", "Do I", "Water", "Positively Somewhere" and "Wonderland". "Melt" and "Yeh, Yeh, Yeh" were last-minute additions to the album's track list, while "Wonderland" was removed and released as a B-side of the "On the Horizon" DVD single. On 23 January 2003 a group of journalists were invited to the album's listening party and an interview. Virgin executives stated that they hoped "this will be the record that will crack the USA and rival the Avril Lavignes of the world". It was also revealed that there were six versions of the album that all the relevant record company people had, in order to decide which one flowed the best. "Here It Comes Again", which was actually one of the first songs of the album to be recorded, served as the first single.

For the album and single covers, Chishom and Virgin commissioned Sean Ellis as the official photographer.

While working on the album, Chisholm recorded "Independence Day" for the soundtrack of the film Bend It Like Beckham; the song was later included on the Japanese edition of Reason. She also wrote the song "Help Me Help You" for Holly Valance, which was included on Valance's debut album Footprints.

Release and promotion 
Reason was released on 10 March 2003. Prior to the album's release Chisholm made appearances on TV shows including CD:UK and V Graham Norton, while she gave some interviews to magazines like the Times Magazine, Attitude and Marie Claire. She also performed a four-song set at HMV London. The set list included her past number-one singles "Never Be the Same Again" and "I Turn to You", as well as the first single from Reason, "Here It Comes Again", and the album track "Positively Somewhere". Promotion also included an exclusive webcast on 24 February 2003 performing four songs, which were the same as the HMV setlist, with the exception of "I Turn to You" being replaced by "Goin' Down". During the webcast Chisholm did a 30-minute interview, where she answered questions from fans from all over the world. She stated that she considered releasing "On the Horizon", "Positively Somewhere", "Reason" and "Melt" as singles. She also stated that she had decided to leave "Wonderland" off the album at the last minute because she thought it was a dark song that was at odds with the album's positive vibe. Chisholm embarked on the Reason Tour in order to promote the album, starting on 24 April 2003 and including 25 shows in Europe.

In September 2003, Chisholm took part on The Games, a British reality sports game show that aired on Channel 4, in promotion of the album, where she was badly injured. Her injury changed the song that was selected to be the third single: "Yeh Yeh Yeh" was originally planned but after her injury, "Melt" was chosen to be launched along with "Yeh Yeh Yeh" as a double A-side, because she could do a small number of performances and "Melt" as a ballad, requiring minimum movement, was thought to be easier to promote. Her injury prevented her from fully promoting her last single and the album further.

Critical reception 

Reason received mixed reviews. AllMusic gave the album two and a half stars out of five, with Stephen Thomas Erlewine stating that "[the songs] are colourless and characterless, sounding as if their main goal is to get on pop radio." He called the album "a real disappointment after the very good, very promising Northern Star." Johnny Dee, writing for The Times, remarked that the songs on Reason "are often crushingly tedious (in spite of its title, the bombastic "Here It Comes Again" never even arrives); and dated (the sensual ballad "Soul Boy" is impardonably Lisa Stansfield-esque)." The Guardian gave Reason two out of five stars, with Alexis Petridis stating that the album "settles on a direction, sounds confident and efficient and wrings the last drops of originality out of Melanie C." Drowned in Sound described the album as "just bland in the extreme. Mel doesn't have the vocal range to pull what she’s trying to do."

In a positive review, Alexis Kirke from MusicOMH called the album a "perfectly packaged piece of pop. Together with Melanie C's carefully tailored new image and press diplomacy, it gives her a truly sporting chance of escaping the gravitational pull of Planet Spice once and for all. The more mature nature of this album will attract a new tween crowd, and they – when combined with Mel’s previous fan-base – will provide Miss Chisholm with the foundation for a successful solo pop career for a few years to come." In his retrospective review for Albumism, Quentin Harrison wrote: "The overarching feel of her second LP began embracing a brighter, tighter sound than the looser, magnetic truculence of Northern Star. Facing down her own personal demons and the presence of a then-budding relationship had a hand in shaping Reason. The songwriting, excellent throughout, is the biggest indicator of Melanie C's refreshed mindset." In a 2007 interview with he Guardian, Chisholm stated that she thought that the songs on Reason "could have been stronger."

Chart performance 
Reason debuted at number 5 on the UK Albums Chart on the issue dated 22 March 2003. Sales began to decline in the second week, with the album falling to number 19, appearing on the chart for three more weeks before falling out. The release of the second single "On the Horizon" in June 2003 boosted the sales of the album, with the album reappearing on the UK Albums Chart for two weeks at number 81 and 99. The final single, "Melt"/"Yeh, Yeh, Yeh", did not help the album re-chart in the top 100. Reason entered the chart for the last time on 17 January 2004, completing an eight-week appearance. Because of the poor sales, Virgin Records decided to drop Melanie C at the end of 2003. In an interview with The Guardian in 2007, Chisholm stated that she had "mixed feelings" about being dropped after the poor sales of Reason, but stated that she knew that Virgin Records "were starting to lose faith in me, so I was actually quite relieved to go."

Track listing

Personnel

Melanie C – vocals
Simon Clarke – baritone saxophone, alto flute
Marius De Vries – keyboards, programming
Luís Jardim – percussion
Chris Garcia – guitar, backing vocals, bass guitar, percussion
Rick Nowels – piano, backing vocals, acoustic guitar, electric piano, mellotron, synthesizer
Brandon Fields – trumpet saxophone
Mike Busby – guitar
Steve Sidelnyk – drums
Lewis Taylor – guitar, backing vocals
Peter John Vettese – piano
Rhett Lawrence – guitar, programming
Andy Maclure – drums
Jon Stewart – guitar
Paul Bushnell – bass guitar
James Sanger – programming
Olle Romo – guitar
Marcus Brown – keyboards, guitar, mandolin, percussion
Jake Davies – programming
Jamie Candiloro – keyboards, piano
David Munday – guitar
Jerry Hey – trumpet
Abe Laboriel Jr. – drums
Eric Erlandson – guitar
Rusty Anderson – electric guitar
Ian Thomas – drums
Alexis Smith – keyboards, programming
Peter Wilson – guitar
Phil Thornalley – keyboards, guitar
Wayne Rodrigues – drum programming
Kim Kahn – bass guitar
Monte Pittman – guitar
John Savannah – piano, synthesizer
Curt Bisquera – drums
Guy Chambers – keyboards
Richard Flack – percussion, programming
Bill Reichenbach Jr. – saxophone
Phil Spalding – bass guitar
Damian LeGassick – keyboards, programming, guitar
Pete Hofmann – additional drum programming
Phil Palmer – guitar
Claire Worrall – backing vocals

Charts

Certifications

References

External links
Official website

2003 albums
Melanie C albums
Virgin Records albums
Albums produced by Rick Nowels
Albums produced by Marius de Vries